KAIR-FM (93.7 FM) is a radio station broadcasting a country music format. Licensed to Horton, Kansas, United States, the station is currently owned by KNZA Inc. and features locally originating programming from its studio in Atchison, Kansas.

Programming

A three-hour local morning show is broadcast from 6:00 am until 9:00 am Monday through Friday, and includes such content as local news, sports, and weather reports. The news is locally originated, with an emphasis on the coverage area of northeast Kansas and northwest Missouri. The content is shared with the other stations in the corporate group and posted online at mscnews.net. Sports includes an emphasis on local and regional high school and college teams, including providing play-by-play of local athletic competitions.

KAIR-FM history
The station was assigned call sign KADF on June 9, 1993. On October 31, 1994, the station changed its call sign to KERE-FM, and on August 19, 1996 to KAIR-FM.

KAIR (AM) history

The license for KAIR (1470 AM) was cancelled by the Federal Communications Commission on April 17, 2019.

References

External links

KAIR-FM

KAIR (AM)
FCC Station Search Details: DKAIR (Facility ID: 33398)
FCC History Cards for KAIR (covering as 1937-1980 as KVAK / KARE)

AIR-FM
Country radio stations in the United States
Radio stations established in 1993
1993 establishments in Kansas